is a Japanese voice actress and singer affiliated with VIMS and Starchild. She has been affectionately nicknamed  by her Japanese fans. Since then, she has been involved in excess of 350 productions in addition to promotional material, concert performances, as well as charting several albums and singles. She won the award for Best Supporting Voice Actress in the 4th Seiyu Awards.

She is one of a handful of Japanese idol voice actors that rose to prominence in the 2000s, whose popularity today has been attributed to their solid experience and long-term interaction with their fan base, as opposed to the contemporary norms of youth and beauty in the entertainment industry. As a result of her ongoing success, she has performed solo at large music venues, such as the Nippon Budokan in 2009 and the Yoyogi National Gymnasium's First Stadium in 2015, each with capacities of approximately 14,000 and 13,000, respectively.  Her official fanclub is the "Black Cat Alliance".

Some of her notable roles in anime include Naru Narusegawa in Love Hina, Izayoi Riko/Cure Magical's speaking voice in Witchy PreCure!, Multi in To Heart, Tohru Honda in Fruits Basket, Ai in Dōbutsu no Mori, Ayu Tsukimiya in Kanon, Yuki Cross in Vampire Knight, Hanyuu and Maria Ushiromiya in, respectively, Higurashi When They Cry and Umineko When They Cry, Miss Monochrome in Miss Monochrome, Minori Kushieda in Toradora!, Tsubasa Hanekawa in Monogatari, Chie Satonaka in Persona 4, Kōko Kaga in Golden Time, Carla in Fairy Tail and Wiz in KonoSuba.

Personal life
Born in Tokyo, Horie spent much of her younger years as a latchkey kid. As an only child, (at that time) she would spend most of her time alone, playing outside of her residence after school until 7pm, when her parents would return from work. In junior high school, she joined the volleyball club but did not enjoy it much. Horie refers to her time at junior high and high school as her 'dark era'. Early childhood interests included watching the anime series Dirty Pair. She was fascinated by the main premise as a detective. She would act out scenes from memory with a school friend and also record herself with a cassette player.

In 1995, during the first year of college, Horie auditioned at the Japan Voice Acting Institute for a scholarship, the voice training school for Arts Vision. She can be quoted as saying "I went for an audition instead of hunting for a job, hahaha....". Horie graduated after 4 years of training. During this time she entered the SME Voice Actor Audition in 1996, winning the Namco Prize, (with Ayako Kawasumi winning the Special Award). On August 28, 1996, Horie and 21 other voice students (including Yukari Tamura) were unveiled at Nippon Cultural Broadcasting Inc.'s "SOMETHING DREAMS '96" at the Tokyo International Exhibition Centre as the Dorikan Club, a group of aspiring voice actresses.

Career

1997–1999: Early career
Whilst still training and under the representation of Arts Vision, Horie was able to make her voice actor debut in the 1997 Sega Saturn game, Voice Fantasia: Ushinawareta Voice Power. Her first leading role was in the 1998 anime Kurogane Communication, of which she sang the theme songs, "My best friend" and "Dear Mama". These two songs were released as Horie's first single under the Pony Canyon music label.  In 1999, with the increasing number of eroge and visual novels being adapted to anime, Horie was able to win a major role as Multi, a robotic girl, in the romantic anime To Heart.

2000–2003: Growing success
The following year, Horie succeeded in auditioning for the lead female role of the TV anime adaptation of the shōnen manga comedy Love Hina, as Naru Narusegawa. Love Hina was a huge hit, with sales of over one million DVDs.  The high popularity at the time lead to Lycos Japan using the anime to advertise its search engine and other services, with narration from Horie. This was to be her first CM. The ascending popularity of Love Hina spawned a lucrative franchise of OVAs, Drama CDs and games, of which Horie reprised the star role.

In regard to their rising fame, Horie worked with Yukari Tamura and form the group .  This group had two debuts in 2000, on April 30 at the Yoyogi National Gymnasium and May 13 at Nagoya's Nadia Park Complex.  The first of these was called "Yamato Nadeshiko Debut Kinen First Live ~suddenly 1000 seconds live in Yoyogi~", which happened during the "Dorikan Club Fifth Anniversary Event".  Together they would release two singles,  in 2000  and "Merry Merrily" in 2001, the latter being used as an insert song in the Love Hina Christmas Special.  This collaboration ended with a seven date concert tour during June 2003, including stops at Sapporo, Nagoya, Osaka and Tokyo.

2000 also saw Horie publish her first photobook, and the release of her debut album, Mizutamari ni Utsuru Sekai, through the Starchild label which featured two songs from Love Hina.

In 2001, Starchild established her official fan club called , where member benefits included fan events, priority seating in concerts, bimonthly newsletters, and access to exclusive merchandise. The first meeting, which was named "Black Cat Rally Vol.1 - Akasaka BLITZ" was on July 21, where they held a rally and a quiz show.

Early in 2002, Horie's first solo concert tour kicked off on January 26 at the Club Diamond Hall in Nagoya, a 1000 capacity venue.  "堀江由衣 First Live Tour", lasted a total of 6 nights, travelling to Tokyo and ending on February 11 in Osaka at the Matsushita IMP Hall. In 2002, she voiced Ayu Tsukimiya in the anime adaptation of Kanon, an adult visual novel that she had also voiced in 1999.  Horie released her first collection of music videos on July 29.  The 27 minute VHS tape was called Yui Horie CLIPS 0 〜since '00〜'01〜, featuring interviews, making-ofs and notably the music video for "Love Destiny" the theme song of the 2001 anime adaptation of Sister Princess. 

The same year, Horie started her weekly radio show, which was first broadcast on October 6,  and can currently be heard on the station  (AM 1134 kHz) at 22:00 – 22:30 every Sunday. Her signature catchphrase is "Angel Beam in your Heart!" and frequently features anison guests such as angela, Nana Mizuki and Megumi Hayashibara.  As of the end of 2016, the show has run in excess of 740 episodes.

In 2003, Horie established herself as a popular singer when her third album "Sky" peaked at 10th in the Oricon charts.

Other activities 
In October 2005, she founded Aice5, a J-Pop group consisting of four other voice actors, to help launch their careers.  Their debut single was "Get Back", released March 13, 2006.  Aice5 was disbanded on September 20, 2007, at their farewell concert "Final Aice5 Party LAST Aice5" at the Yokohama Arena. During this time, they released six singles and one album.  Their album "Love Aice5" was released on February 26, 2007, remaining in the Oricon charts for four weeks with a highest rank of eight.  Aice5 has since been revived, announced on July 17, 2015, with the intention to release a new single on September 30 and have their comeback concert on November 22.

Horie has collaborated with a few other artists. In 2004, she released "Scramble" together with Unscandal.  This ska inspired song was used as an opening theme song for the romantic comedy anime School Rumble . And in 2006, she formed the goth band Kurobara Hozonkai (lit. "Black Rose Preservation Society"), with Horie taking the stage name of YUIEL.  This band released the album "A Votre Sante!!" in 2008 and has been relatively inactive since.

Horie was affiliated with Arts Vision. However, she eventually left the agency in mid-2007 during an unrelated scandal in the agency's top management and became a freelance voice actress. Today, she's affiliated with VIMS, a division of I'm Enterprise. She has published seven independent musical albums. Nearly all of them incorporate at least one track from an anime she has worked with. She currently releases music under the Starchild label (a subdivision of King Records).

In late 2012, Horie created and voiced the 3D animated character Miss Monochrome. Her first appearance was in The Adventure Over Yui Horie III ~Secret Mission Tour~ concert, acting as the antagonist who wanted to turn the world black and white. The opening theme song, Poker Face, was released as a musical single. Other notable appearances include the iOS game Girlfriend Beta, a self-titled manga series and cameos in other anime.

Filmography

Anime

Feature films

Overseas dubbing

Tokusatsu

Video games

Discography 
All releases are under King Records, sub-label Starchild, unless otherwise noted.

Studio albums

Compilation albums

Singles

Drama CDs

Videography

Bibliography 
  (2000)
  (2001)
  (2006)
  (2009)
  (2012)

References

External links 
 
VIMS profile 
 

1976 births
Living people
Anime singers
Arts Vision voice actors
Japanese women pop singers
Japanese-language singers
Japanese video game actresses
Japanese voice actresses
King Records (Japan) artists
Music YouTubers
Sega people
Singers from Tokyo
Voice actresses from Tokyo
20th-century Japanese actresses
20th-century Japanese women singers
20th-century Japanese singers
21st-century Japanese actresses
21st-century Japanese women singers
21st-century Japanese singers
Japanese YouTubers